Acacia leptocarpa, commonly known as north coast wattle, is a shrub or small tree native to New Guinea and coastal regions of northern Australia.

Description
It has dark grey to almost black coloured bark of the ‘ironbark’ type. The angular branchlets are lenticellate and glabrous. It also has small and inconspicuous stipules.

A. leptocarpa resembles Acacia cowleana and Acacia elachantha but has glabrous and thinner phyllodes and longer, more curved pods. It is thought to be allied with Acacia tropica and Acacia cretata. The seed pods appear very similar to those of Acacia gardneri.

Taxonomy
The species was first formally described by the botanist George Bentham in 1842 as part of William Jackson Hooker's work Notes on Mimoseae, with a synopsis of species as published in the London Journal of Botany. It was reclassified as Racosperma leptocarpum by Leslie Pedley in 1987 and transferred back to genus Acacia in 2001.
The type specimen was collected by Allan Cunningham around Cape Flinders in Queensland in 1820.
The specific epithet is derived from the Greek words leptos meaning slender and carpos meaning fruit in reference to the thin seed pods.

Distribution
It is mostly found in open forest, but will also grow in monsoon forest and rainforest margins. The natural range extends from Carlton Hill Station in the Kimberley region of Western Australia eastwards across the Top End of the Northern Territory to Cape York Peninsula and southwards to Southern Central Queensland where it is found along the margins of watercourses and swampy areas growing in sandy or rocky soils occasionally around laterite as a part of open Eucalyptus or Melaleuca woodland communities.

See also
List of Acacia species

References

leptocarpa
Flora of the Northern Territory
Flora of Queensland
Acacias of Western Australia
Plants described in 1842
Taxa named by George Bentham
Taxa named by Allan Cunningham (botanist)